"Practice Life" is a song recorded by American country music artists Andy Griggs and Martina McBride.  It was released in September 2002 as the third and final single from Griggs' album Freedom.  The song reached #33 on the Billboard Hot Country Singles & Tracks chart.  The song was written by Griggs and Brett James.

Chart performance

References

2002 singles
2002 songs
Andy Griggs songs
Martina McBride songs
Songs written by Andy Griggs
Songs written by Brett James
Song recordings produced by David Malloy
RCA Records singles